Devonte Daryll Delroy Small (born 25 March 1995) is a professional footballer who plays as a midfielder.

Born in the United States, he has represented Guyana at international level.

Club career
Small played for both Lane United and the Portland Timbers U23s while studying at the Oregon State University.

After leaving university in the United States, Small moved to Iceland and signed for third division side Reynir Sandgerði. He made six appearances in the league and scored three goals in two appearances in the Icelandic Cup during the 2017 season.

Career statistics

Club

Notes

International

References

External links
 
 Devonte Small at Caribbean Football Database
 Devonte Small at Oregon State University

1995 births
Living people
Association football midfielders
Guyanese footballers
Guyanese expatriate footballers
Guyana international footballers
Expatriate footballers in Iceland
Oregon State Beavers men's soccer players
Soccer players from San Antonio